Jimmy McGriff at the Organ is an album by organist Jimmy McGriff recorded and released by Sue Records in 1964.

Reception 

The Allmusic review by Michael Erlewine stated "This is drum/sax driven McGriff at his best".

Track listing 
All compositions by Jimmy McGriff except where noted
 "Kiko" – 3:28
 "Jumpin' at the Woodside" (Count Basie) – 3:21
 "All Day Long" (Billy Strayhorn) – 3:52
 "That's All" (Thomas Waller) – 5:29
 "Hello Betty" – 4:58	
 "Close Your Eyes" (Will Collins, Al Lewis) – 5:26
 "When You're Smiling the Whole World Smiles with You" (Mark Fisher, Joe Goodwin, Larry Shay) – 4:24
 "Shiny Stockings" (Frank Foster) – 7:20

Personnel 
Jimmy McGriff – organ
Rudolph Johnson – tenor saxophone, soprano saxophone
Larry Frazier – guitar
Jimmie Smith – drums

References 

1964 albums
Jimmy McGriff albums
Sue Records albums